Houston v. State, 583 S.W.2d 267 (1980), was a case decided by the Supreme Court of Tennessee that held that "repeated shots or blows" was sufficient circumstantial evidence to prove premeditation and deliberation for first degree murder.

Subsequent history
Houston was overruled by the case State v. Brown, which required more evidence than repeated blows to show deliberation.

Notes

References

External links

United States murder case law
1980 in United States case law
Tennessee state case law
1980 in Tennessee
U.S. state criminal case law
United States evidence case law
Murder in Tennessee